The 2010 Rileys Darts Zones UK Open was the eighth year of the PDC darts tournament where, following numerous regional qualifying heats throughout Britain, players competed in a single elimination tournament to be crowned champion. The tournament was held at the Reebok Stadium in Bolton, England, from 3–6 June 2010, and had the nickname, "the FA Cup of darts" as a random draw was staged after each round until the final.

It was eventually won by Phil Taylor who defeated Scotland's Gary Anderson 11–5 to make it his fourth UK Open and second consecutive championship. Earlier in the tournament, Anderson was the on the wrong side of a nine-dart finish from Mervyn King.

In the fourth round of this tournament, Phil Taylor beat Kevin Painter 9–0 with a 3–dart average of 118.66, which at the time was the all-time highest 3–dart average for a televised darts match. It was eventually beaten on 25 February 2016 in the 2016 Premier League Darts meeting in Aberdeen, when Michael van Gerwen averaged 123.40 in beating Michael Smith 7–1.

2010 UK Open qualifiers
There were eight qualifying events staged between February and May 2010 to determine the UK Open Order of Merit Table. The tournament winners were:

Format and qualifiers
The tournament featured 138 players. As in previous years, eight regional UK Open events were staged across the UK where players winning were collated into the UK Open Order Of Merit. The top 96 players and ties in the list, who played a minimum of three events received a place at the final stages.

Top 32 in Order of Merit (receiving byes into third round)

The Rileys qualifiers and the players outside the top 32 of the UK Open Order of Merit began the tournament on the Thursday night. They played down to 32 players, and they were joined by the top 32 of the UK Open Order of Merit the following night, to provide the competition's last 64. A random draw was made after each subsequent round.

Number 33-64 of the Order of Merit (receiving byes into second round)

Remaining Order of Merit qualifiers (starting in first and preliminary round)

32 players qualified from Rileys qualifiers held in Rileys Dart Zones across Britain.

10 players qualified as BDO representatives from Avon, Bedfordshire, East Stirlingshire, Gloucestershire, Hampshire, Lothian, Northumberland, Nottinghamshire, Surrey, Warwickshire. These counties were rewarded one spot each in the UK Open for voting in favour of listening to Barry Hearn's proposed takeover of the BDO.

Prize money
For the second consecutive UK Open, the prize fund was £200,000.

Draw
The draw for the preliminary, first and second rounds was made on 13 May.

Thursday 3 June; Best of 11 legs

Preliminary round

Round 1

 ‡ Steve Farmer received a bye as Dean Edlin was disqualified because he did not register
 † Tony Hutchinson received a bye as Darren Sullivan was disqualified because he did not register

Round 2

 * Chris Mason withdrew for personal reasons.

Friday 4 June; best of 17 legs

Round 3

Saturday 5 June; best of 17 legs

Round 4

Round 5

Sunday 6 June

Last 8 to final

Nine dart finish
Mervyn King hit a nine dart finish in his fourth round match against Gary Anderson, however he lost the match 9-8.

World record
Phil Taylor hit the highest televised average in history in his 9-0 victory over Kevin Painter, finishing the match with a three-dart average of 118.66.

See also
UK Open history of event and previous winners
2010 in darts includes extended results of Pro Tour events
PDC Pro Tour history of PDC "floor events"

References

External links
The official PDC page for the UK Open

UK Open
UK Open Darts
UK Open
UK Open